Lachnolebia is a genus of beetles in the family Carabidae, containing the following species:

 Lachnolebia cribricollis (A. Morawitz, 1862)
 Lachnolebia shimian Kirschenhofer, 2010

References

Lebiinae